1620 L Street is a high-rise building in Washington, D.C. The building rises 12 floors and  in height. The building was designed by architectural firm Smith, Segreti, Tepper, McMahon & Harned and was completed in 1989. As of July 2008, the structure stands as the 24th-tallest building in the city, tied in rank with 1111 19th Street, 1333 H Street, 1000 Connecticut Avenue, the Republic Building, 1010 Mass, the Army and Navy Club Building and the Watergate Hotel and Office Building. 1620 L Street is an example of postmodern architecture, and has a glass and granite facade. The street level floor is used for commercial retailing.

See also
List of tallest buildings in Washington, D.C.

References

Skyscraper office buildings in Washington, D.C.
Office buildings completed in 1989
1989 establishments in Washington, D.C.